Nuclear espionage is the purposeful giving of state secrets regarding nuclear weapons to other states without authorization (espionage). There have been many cases of known nuclear espionage throughout the history of nuclear weapons and many cases of suspected or alleged espionage. Because nuclear weapons are generally considered one of the most important of state secrets, all nations with nuclear weapons have strict restrictions against the giving of information relating to nuclear weapon design, stockpiles, delivery systems, and deployment. States are also limited in their ability to make public the information regarding nuclear weapons by non-proliferation agreements.

Soviet spies in the Manhattan Project

During the Manhattan Project, the joint effort during World War II by the United States, the United Kingdom, and Canada to create the first nuclear weapons, there were many instances of nuclear espionage in which project scientists or technicians channeled information about bomb development and design to the Soviet Union. These people are often referred to as the Atomic Spies, and their work continued into the early Cold War. Because most of these cases became well known in the context of the anti-Communist 1950s, there has been long-standing dispute over the exact details of these cases, though some of this was settled with the making public of the Venona project transcripts, which were intercepted and decrypted messages between Soviet agents and the Soviet government. Some issues remain unsettled, however.

The most prominent of these included:
Klaus Fuchs – German refugee theoretical physicist who worked with the British delegation at Los Alamos during the Manhattan Project. He was eventually discovered, confessed, and sentenced to jail in Britain. He was later released, and he emigrated to East Germany. Because of his close connection to many aspects of project activities, and his extensive technical knowledge, he is considered to have been the most valuable of the "Atomic Spies" in terms of the information he gave to the Soviet Union about the American fission bomb program. He also gave early information about the American hydrogen bomb program but since he was not present at the time that the successful Teller-Ulam design was discovered, his information on this is not thought to have been of much value.
Theodore Hall – a young American physicist at Los Alamos, whose identity as a spy was not revealed until very late in the 20th century. He was never arrested in connection to his espionage work, though seems to have admitted to it in later years to reporters and to his family.
David Greenglass – an American machinist at Los Alamos during the Manhattan Project. Greenglass confessed that he gave crude schematics of lab experiments to the Russians during World War II. Some aspects of his testimony against his sister and brother-in-law (the Rosenbergs, see below) are now thought to have been fabricated in an effort to keep his own wife from prosecution. Greenglass confessed to his espionage and was given a long prison term.
George Koval – The American-born son of a Belorussian emigrant family that returned to the Soviet Union where he was inducted into the Red Army and recruited into the GRU intelligence service.  He infiltrated the US Army and became a radiation health officer in the Special Engineering Detachment.  Acting under the code name DELMAR he obtained information from Oak Ridge and the Dayton Project about the Urchin (detonator) used on the Fat Man plutonium bomb.  His work was not known to the west until he was posthumously recognized as a hero of the Russian Federation by Vladimir Putin in 2007.
Ethel and Julius Rosenberg – Americans who were supposedly involved in coordinating and recruiting an espionage network which included David Greenglass. While most scholars believe that Julius was likely involved in some sort of network, whether or not Ethel was involved or cognizant of the activities remains a matter of dispute. Julius and Ethel refused to confess to any charges, and were convicted and executed at Sing Sing Prison.
Harry Gold – American, confessed to acting as a courier for Greenglass and Fuchs.

France
On 10 July 1985, the "action" branch of the French foreign intelligence services carried out the sinking of the Rainbow Warrior. During the operation, two operatives sank the flagship of the Greenpeace fleet, the Rainbow Warrior in the port of Auckland, New Zealand. The French government wanted to prevent the ship from interfering with a planned nuclear test in Moruroa.

In April 2013, the French interior intelligence agency DCRI attempted to have the article about the Pierre-sur-Haute military radio station removed from the French language Wikipedia. The DCRI pressured a volunteer administrator of the French language Wikipedia into deleting the article.

Israel

In 1986, a former technician, Mordechai Vanunu, at the Israeli nuclear facility near Dimona revealed information about the Israeli nuclear weapon program to the British press, confirming widely held notions that Israel had an advanced and secretive nuclear weapons program and stockpile. Israel has never acknowledged or denied having a weapons program, and Vanunu was abducted and smuggled to Israel, where he was tried in camera and convicted of treason and espionage.

Whether Vanunu was truly involved in espionage, per se, is debated: Vanunu and his supporters claim that he should be regarded as a whistle-blower (someone who was exposing a secretive and illegal practice), while his opponents see him as a traitor and his divulgence of information as aiding enemies of the Israeli state. Vanunu did not immediately release his information and photos on leaving Israel, travelling for about a year before doing so. The politics of the case are hotly disputed.

China

In a 1999 report of the United States House of Representatives Select Committee on U.S. National Security and Military/Commercial Concerns with the People's Republic of China, chaired by Rep. Christopher Cox (known as the Cox Report), it was revealed that U.S. security agencies believed that there is ongoing nuclear espionage by the People's Republic of China (PRC) at U.S. nuclear weapons design laboratories, especially Los Alamos National Laboratory, Lawrence Livermore National Laboratory, Oak Ridge National Laboratory, and Sandia National Laboratories. According to the report, the PRC had "stolen classified information on all of the United States' most advanced thermonuclear warheads" since the 1970s, including the design of advanced miniaturized thermonuclear warheads (which can be used on MIRV weapons), the neutron bomb, and "weapons codes" which allow for computer simulations of nuclear testing (and allow the PRC to advance their weapon development without testing themselves). The United States was apparently unaware of this until 1995.

The investigations described in the report eventually led to the arrest of Wen Ho Lee, a scientist at Los Alamos, initially accused of giving weapons information to the PRC. The case against Lee eventually fell apart, however, and he was eventually charged only with mishandling of data. Other people and groups arrested or fined were scientist Peter Lee (no relation), who was arrested for allegedly giving submarine radar secrets to China, and Loral Space & Communications and Hughes Electronics who gave China missile secrets. No other arrests regarding the theft of the nuclear designs have been made. The issue was a considerable scandal at the time.

Pakistan 

From 1991—93, during the Prime minister Benazir Bhutto's government, an operative directorate of the ISI's Joint Intelligence Miscellaneous (JIM), conducted highly successful operations in Soviet Union. This directorate successfully procured nuclear material while many operative were posted as the Defence attaché in the Embassy of Pakistan in Moscow; and concurrently obtaining other materials from Romania, Albania, Poland and the former Czechoslovakia.

In January 2004, Dr. Abdul Qadeer Khan confessed to selling restricted technology to Libya, Iran, and North Korea. According to his testimony and reports from intelligence agencies, he sold designs for gas centrifuges (used for uranium enrichment), and sold centrifuges themselves to these three countries. Khan had previously been indicated as having taken gas centrifuge designs from a uranium enrichment company in the Netherlands (URENCO) which he used to jump-start Pakistan's own nuclear weapons program. On February 5, 2004, the president of Pakistan, General Pervez Musharraf, announced that he had pardoned Khan. Pakistan's government claims they had no part in the espionage, but refuses to turn Khan over for questioning by the International Atomic Energy Agency.

See also  
 Atomic spies
 Soviet espionage in the United States

References
Manhattan Project
Rhodes, Richard. Dark Sun: The Making of the Atomic Bomb. New York: Simon & Schuster, 1995.

Israel
Cohen, Avner. Israel and the Bomb. New York: Columbia University Press, 1998.

People's Republic of China
Cox, Christopher, chairman (1999). Report of the United States House of Representatives Select Committee on U.S. National Security and Military/Commercial Concerns with the People's Republic of China., esp. Ch. 2, "PRC Theft of U.S. Thermonuclear Warhead Design Information". Available online at https://web.archive.org/web/20050804234332/http://www.house.gov/coxreport/.
Stober, Dan, and Ian Hoffman. A convenient spy: Wen Ho Lee and the politics of nuclear espionage. New York: Simon & Schuster, 2001.

Pakistan
Powell, Bill, and Tim McGirk. "The Man Who Sold the Bomb; How Pakistan's A.Q. Khan outwitted Western intelligence to build a global nuclear-smuggling ring that made the world a more dangerous place", Time Magazine (14 February 2005): 22.

Types of espionage
Nuclear weapons
Nuclear secrecy